Torrelisa is a locality located in the municipality of El Pueyo de Araguás, in Huesca province, Aragon, Spain. As of 2020, it has a population of 17.

Geography 
Torrelisa is located 108km northeast of Huesca.

References

Populated places in the Province of Huesca